My Friend Irma is a 1949 American comedy film directed by George Marshall. It was the motion picture debut of the comedy team Dean Martin and Jerry Lewis. The film was released on August 16, 1949, by Paramount, and is based upon the CBS radio series My Friend Irma that first aired in 1947.

Plot
The storyline follows two women, Irma Peterson and Jane Stacey, who room together in New York. Irma is a somewhat dim-witted blonde who deep down has good intentions. Jane is an ambitious woman who dreams of marrying a rich man. She winds up as a secretary for a millionaire, Richard Rhinelander.

Meanwhile, Irma is in love with Al, who is a con-artist looking to get rich quick. Al visits an orange-juice stand and encounters Steve Laird singing. He convinces him to leave his job and promises to make him famous. Steve and his partner Seymour then wind up living at Irma and Jane's apartment through the invitation of Al. She is angry, but Irma convinces her to let them stay. This opens up a romantic arc where Jane and Steve fall in love.

After a successful singing debut, Steve gets upset with Jane's wishes to marry a wealthy man and he leaves and returns to the juice stand. Meanwhile, Irma gets into a situation and decides to end her life. However, she finds out a radio station is about to call her for a $50,000 question, so she rushes home to answer the question. She wins the prize and all live happily ever after.

Cast
 John Lund as Al
 Marie Wilson as Irma Peterson
 Diana Lynn as Jane Stacy
 Don DeFore as Richard Rhinelander III
 Dean Martin as Steve Laird
 Jerry Lewis as Seymour
 Hans Conried as Professor Kropotkin
 Kathryn Givney as Mrs. Rhinelander
 Percy Helton as Mr. Z. Clyde
 Gloria Gordon as Mrs. O'Reilly, the Landlady

Production
My Friend Irma was filmed from February 22 through April 12, 1949. Although filming was already underway, producer Hal B. Wallis thought it would be a low-risk introduction of the team of Martin & Lewis to the screen. They had been approached by several film studios before signing a five-year contract with Paramount Pictures.

Lewis was originally cast to play Al, but after the first day of screen tests it was obvious that he was wrong for the part that the studio had selected for him. Concerned that he would be left out of the film and that they were abandoning the formula that had created the Martin & Lewis team's comedic success ("handsome guy with the monkey"), a frantic Lewis quickly came up with the idea of playing a comical sidekick to Steve, and the character Seymour was written into the script. Lewis reminisces in detail about this career turning point in his book on Martin (Dean and Me) as well as his lengthy online Archive of American Television videotaped interview.

Marie Wilson, Hans Conried, and Gloria Gordon played the same characters in the movie that they did on the radio show. Felix Bressart was originally cast in the film as Professor Kropotkin, but he died suddenly during filming. His completed scenes were reshot with Hans Conried, who took over the role.

Sequel
It was followed the following year by a sequel, My Friend Irma Goes West directed by Hal Walker, the only sequel that Martin & Lewis ever made.

Home media
My Friend Irma has been released twice on DVD By Paramount Home Entertainment. It was originally released on a two-film collection with its sequel, My Friend Irma Goes West, on October 25, 2005. A year later, it was included on an eight-film DVD set, the Dean Martin and Jerry Lewis Collection: Volume One, released on October 31, 2006.

Legacy
It is one of the few pre-1950 Paramount sound films still owned by Paramount as most of their catalog of films were sold to EMKA, Ltd., which was subsequently purchased by MCA Inc. in 1958, who would later purchase Universal Pictures in 1962 and has been the distributor for those films ever since.

The 2002 film Martin and Lewis was a biopic about the comedy team starring Sean Hayes and Jeremy Northam. A scene from the film depicts Lewis as wanting to play the role of Al, but Wallis suggesting that he should play a new character, Seymour, instead, to which Lewis reluctantly agrees.

References

External links 

1949 films
1949 comedy films
American comedy films
1940s English-language films
Films based on radio series
Films set in New York City
Paramount Pictures films
Films directed by George Marshall
Films produced by Hal B. Wallis
Films scored by Roy Webb
American black-and-white films
1940s American films